The 2013 Walt Disney World Pro Soccer Classic was the fourth edition of the Walt Disney World Pro Soccer Classic, a pre-season exhibition tournament held at the ESPN Wide World of Sports Complex at the Walt Disney World in Bay Lake, Florida. A total of six Major League Soccer teams participated.

The defending champions were the Vancouver Whitecaps FC, but the club did not participate. The Houston Dynamo and FC Dallas did not compete for the first time since the competition's inception in 2010. Toronto FC was the last original team to remain.

The tournament was won by the Montreal Impact, who defeated the Columbus Crew 1–0 in the final.

Teams
The following clubs competed in the tournament.

Matches 

On December 14, 2012, the schedule was released.

Group stage

Group A

Group B

Championship round

Consolation matches

Championship match

References

External links
Official Site 
Easter Disney

2013
2013 in American soccer
2013 in sports in Florida